Meenakshi Thampan is an Indian politician, a member of the Communist Party of India from Thrissur district, Kerala. She was a Member of the Legislative Assembly from Kodungallur Assembly Constituency in 1991 – 1996 &1996–2001. She was the member of Kerala State Women's Commission.

References

1941 births
Living people
Communist Party of India politicians from Kerala
Female politicians of the Communist Party of India
Malayali politicians
People from Thrissur district
Sree Kerala Varma College alumni
Women members of the Kerala Legislative Assembly
Kerala MLAs 1991–1996
Kerala MLAs 1996–2001
20th-century Indian women politicians
20th-century Indian politicians
21st-century Indian women politicians
21st-century Indian politicians